Tofa Fatialofa Momoe (13 March 1923 – 29 December 1980) was a Western Samoan politician. He served as a member of the Legislative Assembly from 1967 until his death, and as Minister for the Post Office, Radio and Broadcasting from 1970 to 1971.

Biography
During his youth Momoe was a successful boxer. He was elected to the Legislative Assembly in 1967, unseating incumbent MLA Auelua Filipo. After being re-elected in 1970 he was appointed Minister for the Post Office, Radio and Broadcasting in the new government. However, he resigned from the cabinet the following year.

He was re-elected to the Legislative Assembly again in 1973,  1976 and  1979. He died in December 1980 during a visit to Honolulu to see the son of a friend ordained as a priest.

References

1923 births
Members of the Legislative Assembly of Samoa
Government ministers of Samoa
1980 deaths